The 1987 Plymouth City Council election took place on 7 May 1987 to elect members of Plymouth City Council in Devon, England. This was on the same day as other local elections. The Conservative Party retained control of the council, which it had held since its creation in 1973.

Overall results

|-
| colspan=2 style="text-align: right; margin-right: 1em" | Total
| style="text-align: right;" | 60
| colspan=5 |
| style="text-align: right;" | 92,972
| style="text-align: right;" |

Ward results

Budshead (3 seats)

Compton (3 seats)

Drake (3 seats)

Efford (3 seats)

Eggbuckland (3 seats)

Estover (3 seats)

Ham (3 seats)

Honicknowle (3 seats)

Keyham (3 seats)

Mount Gould (3 seats)

Plympton Erle (3 seats)

Plympton St Mary (3 seats)

Plymstock Dunstone (3 seats)

Plymstock Radford (3 seats)

Southway (3 seats)

St Budeax (3 seats)

St Peter (3 seats)

Stoke (3 seats)

Sutton (3 seats)

Trelawny (3 seats)

References

1987 English local elections
May 1987 events in the United Kingdom
1987
1980s in Devon